Samassi Abou (born 4 April 1973) is a former Ivorian professional footballer who played as a forward. He played internationally for the French under-21 team.

Life and career
Abou started playing in France for FC Martigues, before moving to Lyon. In October 1997, after a spell at AS Cannes, he made the move to English football, signing for West Ham United for £250,000. Signed by manager Harry Redknapp to give more options for strikers, Abou made his West Ham debut on 9 November 1997, in a 2–1 away defeat to Chelsea coming on as a substitute for John Moncur. His opening West Ham goal came on 6 January 1998, in the League Cup. In a fifth-round game at the Boleyn Ground, Abou came on as a substitute for Paul Kitson to score their only goal in a 2–1 defeat. In the following game, on 10 January 1998, Abou scored twice as West Ham beat Barnsley 6–0. Abou received his only red card in the next game, a 1–0 away defeat to Tottenham Hotspur. Fouling Ramon Vega in an off-the-ball incident, Abou was dismissed by referee David Elleray. Abou finished the 1997–98 season with 6 goals from 26 games, including two on the last day of the season in a 4–3 home defeat of Leicester City. West Ham fans would boo Abou whenever he scored, making an "Abooooooooo" noise. In 31 appearances in all competitions, he scored six times, before being released to Ipswich Town in December 1998, where he scored once against Sheffield United.

In October 1999, he signed for Walsall, an unsuccessful spell which lasted little over a month. He also spent time on loan at Troyes, and played in Scotland for three months at Kilmarnock.

Abou continued his career back in France, playing for Ajaccio and Lorient.

Honours
West Ham United
UEFA Intertoto Cup: 1999

References

External links
 
 
 
 
 Saddlers A-Z at the Walsall F.C. Official Website

1973 births
Living people
Ivorian emigrants to France
Ivorian footballers
France under-21 international footballers
French footballers
French expatriate footballers
Ivorian expatriate footballers
Ligue 1 players
Expatriate footballers in France
FC Martigues players
Olympique Lyonnais players
AS Cannes players
West Ham United F.C. players
Ipswich Town F.C. players
Premier League players
Walsall F.C. players
ES Troyes AC players
Kilmarnock F.C. players
AC Ajaccio players
FC Lorient players
English Football League players
Scottish Premier League players
Expatriate footballers in England
Expatriate footballers in Scotland
People from Gagnoa
Association football forwards